Eschscholzia  is a genus of 12 annual or perennial plants in the Papaveraceae (poppy) family. The genus was named after the Baltic German/Imperial Russian botanist Johann Friedrich von Eschscholtz (1793–1831). All species are native to Mexico or the southern United States.

Description
Leaves are deeply cut, glabrous and glaucous, mostly basal, though a few grow on the stem.

Flowers have four yellow or orange petals, and grow at the end of the stem, either alone or in many-flowered cymes. The petals are wedge-shaped, forming a funnel. The two fused sepals fall off as the flower bud opens. There are 12 to numerous stamens. The flowers close in cloudy weather.

Seeds are tiny and black, held in long pointed pods that split open when ripe often with enough force to fling the seeds some distance with an audible snap.

The taproot gives off a colorless or orange clear juice, which is mildly toxic.

Cultivation
The best-known species is the California poppy (Eschscholzia californica), the state flower of California. Eschscholzia caespitosa is very similar to E. californica, but smaller and without a collar below the petals.

Another species common in cultivation is Eschscholzia lobbii, which is often sold as Eschscholzia caespitosa. E. lobbii has yellow flowers and very narrow leaves.

They prosper in warm, dry climates, but withstand some frost. They grow in poor soils with good water drainage.

The cultivars 'Apricot Chiffon', with orange/yellow flowers, and 'Rose Chiffon', with pink and cream flowers, have gained the Royal Horticultural Society's Award of Garden Merit.

Species

References

External links

Calflora: Database: Eschscholzia species — with images.
California poppies and their relatives

 
Papaveraceae genera
Ephemeral plants
Flora of California
Garden plants of North America
Johann Friedrich von Eschscholtz
Taxa named by Adelbert von Chamisso